Érick Alejandro Ávalos Alejo (born 21 April 2000) is a Mexican professional footballer who plays as a defender for Chihuahua.

Career statistics

Club

Honours
Tigres UANL
CONCACAF Champions League: 2020

References

External links
 
 
 

Living people
2000 births
Association football defenders
Tigres UANL footballers
Liga MX players
Liga Premier de México players
Tercera División de México players
Footballers from Nuevo León
Mexican footballers